Negombo Youth Sports Club is a Sri Lankan professional football club. They play in the top flight domestic league, the Sri Lanka Champions League.

References

Football clubs in Sri Lanka